Gerardus van der Wel (5 January 1895 – 31 May 1945) was a Dutch long-distance runner. He competed in the men's 5000 metres at the 1920 Summer Olympics. He was killed in the Bergen-Belsen concentration camp during World War II.

References

External links
 

1895 births
1945 deaths
Athletes (track and field) at the 1920 Summer Olympics
Dutch male long-distance runners
Olympic athletes of the Netherlands
Dutch people who died in Bergen-Belsen concentration camp
Sportspeople from The Hague
Dutch Jews who died in the Holocaust